On 29 January 2010, the IUCN Red List of Threatened Species identified three data deficient species in the Nemertina phylum (Animalia kingdom).

Enopla

Hoplonemertea

Prosorhochmidae

References
 IUCN 2009. IUCN Red List of Threatened Species, v2009.2. Source of the above list: online IUCN Red List. Retrieved d.d. 29 January 2010.

Nemertina